Abhayapuri North Assembly constituency is one of the 126 constituencies of the Legislative Assembly of Assam state in northeastern India.

Abhayapuri North (constituency number 34) is one of the 4 constituencies located in Bongaigaon district.

Abhayapuri North is part of Barpeta Lok Sabha constituency along with 9 other assembly segments, namely, Bongaigaon and Abhayapuri South in this district, Patacharkuchi, Barpeta, Jania, Baghbar, Sarukhetri and Chenga in Barpeta district and Dharmapur in Nalbari district.

Members of Legislative Assembly
1978: Pani Medhi, Independent.
1985: Mokbul Hussain, Independent.
1991: Bhupen Ray, Asom Gana Parishad.
1996: Bhupen Ray, Asom Gana Parishad.
2001: Bhupen Ray, Asom Gana Parishad.
2006: Abdul Hai Nagori, Indian National Congress.
2011: Bhupen Ray, Asom Gana Parishad.
2016: Abdul Hai Nagori, Indian National Congress.
2021: Abdul Batin Khandakar, Indian National Congress.

Election results

2016 result

2011 result

2006 result

See also
 Abhayapuri
 List of constituencies of Assam Legislative Assembly

References

External links 
 

Assembly constituencies of Assam
Bongaigaon district